"The Postponement" is the 112th episode of the NBC sitcom Seinfeld, and the second episode of the seventh season. It aired in the U.S. on September 28, 1995. The story picks up from the plot of the previous episode, as an increasingly agitated George tries to postpone his engagement to Susan Ross, and Elaine reacts to the news of the engagement with extreme bitterness and jealousy. "The Postponement" also initiated the plot thread of Kramer suing Java World for serving him an excessively hot cup of coffee.

Plot
A rabbi in Elaine's apartment complex with a cable show persuades the owner of the dog who was keeping her awake in "The Engagement" to keep the dog inside. Elaine later confides in the rabbi that she feels bitter about George getting engaged, and wishes she were getting married instead. The rabbi talks about this to several people, including Jerry and a man who Elaine was attracted to, causing her great shame.

Feeling stressed out and unprepared for his wedding, George suggests to Susan that they postpone it until the first day of Spring. She bursts out sobbing, and George recants the suggestion to console her. After watching a man at Monk's nonchalantly refuse to go with a sobbing woman to an unspecified engagement, George feels his resolve renewed and attempts to postpone the wedding again. Instead, he breaks down in tears and confesses to Susan his real anxieties about the wedding; touched, Susan consoles him and agrees to postpone the wedding.

Kramer and Jerry go to see Plan 9 from Outer Space at the cinema. Kramer sneaks coffee in by hiding it in his shirt, spills it, and scalds himself. This attracts the attention of an usher. Bitter at Kramer because he said he would turn Jerry in if he murdered someone, Jerry informs the usher that Kramer has an outside drink, and Kramer is ejected from the cinema. He promptly forgives Jerry, saying he has a case for a lawsuit because the coffee was too hot.

Susan and George watch the rabbi's TV show. The rabbi recounts the story Elaine told him, referencing both Elaine and George by name, and mentions Elaine said George once argued that visiting a prostitute while engaged does not constitute cheating. (Elaine hadn't spoken to George since he became engaged, meaning George must have been speaking hypothetically, but it is unclear if Susan knows this.)

Production
Rabbi Kirschbaum was named after Seinfeld writer Bruce Kirschbaum (though the character was renamed Rabbi Glickman in his later appearances).

Jerry Seinfeld's delivery of the line "I think it's fantastic, I think it's a fantastic idea" is an homage to comedian Jackie Mason.

The story of Kramer's lawsuit over spilled coffee is a parody of the McDonald's coffee case.

Jerry tells Kramer that he missed seeing Plan 9 from Outer Space five years ago due to a problem at a restaurant.  This is a reference to the second season episode "The Chinese Restaurant".

References

External links

Seinfeld (season 7) episodes
1995 American television episodes
Television episodes written by Larry David